The Police headquarters building is a heritage building in Chennai, Tamil Nadu, India. It is located facing the Marina Beach opposite the Queen Mary's College and the lighthouse on the junction of Dr. Radhakrishnan Salai and Kamaraj Salai. It was built in 1839. It houses the director general (DGP) of the Tamil Nadu Police. The building was renovated in 1993.

History

The building was built in 1839. Known as "Perfect Unanimity", the present building was originally a Free Masons lodge, which was taken on lease by the Police in 1865 for a rent of  90 per month. In 1874, the Madras Presidency Police bought the building for a sum of  20,000. The building was expanded and repaired at a cost of  10,000.

In 1993, the building was renovated.

See also

 Chennai Police Commissionerate
 Heritage structures in Chennai
 Architecture of Chennai

References

Office buildings in Chennai
Police headquarters
Government buildings in Tamil Nadu
Tamil Nadu Police
Heritage sites in Chennai
1839 establishments in India
Government buildings completed in 1839